The Great Lakes Storm was a basketball team that played in the Continental Basketball Association for three seasons, beginning in 2002 and ending in 2005.  They were based in Birch Run, Michigan, a small town between Flint and Saginaw. The Storm played at the Birch Run Expo Center. The original team was called the Flint Fuze.

References

Continental Basketball Association teams
Defunct basketball teams in the United States
Basketball teams in Michigan
2002 establishments in Michigan
2005 disestablishments in Michigan
Basketball teams established in 2002
Basketball teams disestablished in 2005